Leroy Oehlers (born 12 December 1992) is an Aruban international footballer who plays for Dutch club Hercules, as a left back.

Career
He has played club football for SV Huizen and Hercules.

He made his international debut for Aruba in 2013.

References

1992 births
Living people
Aruban footballers
Aruba international footballers
SV Huizen players
Association football fullbacks
Aruban expatriate footballers
Aruban expatriates in the Netherlands
Expatriate footballers in the Netherlands